Rosby is an unincorporated community in Beltrami and Hubbard counties, in the U.S. state of Minnesota.

History
A post office was established at Rosby in 1900, and remained in operation until 1909. The community was named for Ole Rosby, an early Norwegian settler.

References

Unincorporated communities in Beltrami County, Minnesota
Unincorporated communities in Hubbard County, Minnesota
Unincorporated communities in Minnesota